Aaj Aur Kal is a 1947 Indian Hindustani film. The film is directed by Khwaja Ahmad Abbas.

Cast
 Shyam
 Arif
 Nita
 Nayantara

Music
The music for the film is composed by Khurshid Anwar with lyrics penned by Sohan Lal Sahir and Zahir Kashmiri.
 "Kaliyon Ko Masalane" - Singer: Naseem Akhtar
 "Ao Sathi Ao" - Singer: Zeenat Begum, Imadad Husain
 "Pade Ishq Mein" - Singer: Zeenat Begum
 "Jam Utha Le O Pine" - Singer: Naseem Akhtar

References

External links

1947 films
1940s Hindi-language films
Films directed by K. A. Abbas
Films scored by Khurshid Anwar
1940s Urdu-language films
Indian comedy films
1947 comedy films
Indian black-and-white films
Urdu-language Indian films